The Kałłа́ur family was a szlachta family originating from the Grand Duchy of Lithuania.

History
The Grand Duke Vytautas founded the Kałavur fortress to protect the southern border of the Grand Duchy of Lithuania at the end of XIV c. The fortress was not preserved. However, the forest near Rașcov, where the citadel was located, still bears the name «Kałaur». Most likely, the surname originates from there.

The earliest written mention was dedicated to Pinsk boyar Theodore («Chviedzka») Kałaur. He concluded a contract for the sale of land with a royal servant Ždan Kyhir in the first half of the 16th c. The members of family took part in the Army census of the Grand Duchy of Lithuania in 1567. Prakopij («Pronko») Kałaur, an officer of the court in Pinsk, the son of Theodore and Ivan Kałaur were numbered among the cavalry. 

In the XVI c. the village Kałaur (modern Kałłaurowicze) was mentioned for the first time, where the local branch of the family settled. Piotr Kałłaur was elected as a representative  of the nobility of the uyezd of Pinsk in 1853.  The members of family supported the January Uprising in 1863–1864. The monument in honor of the rebels Vasil Kałłaur, Siamion Kałłaur and Anton Šałamicky was opened in Šałomičy near Pinsk in 1933.

Some members of the family were subjected to repression in 1940-1950s. According to the open lists, 7 people were persecuted in Pinsk Region of Byelorussian SSR.

Notable people with surname Kałłaur
 , 1843–1919, chief of Aulie-Ata uyezd, archaeologist and orientalist.
, 1920-2017, Polish military person, diplomat and essayist.
Pavel Kallaur, b. 1962, Belarusian economist and head of the National Bank of Belarus.

References

External links
Szlachta of Pinsk on the web-site «History of Pinsk»

Belarusian nobility
Lithuanian noble families